The 1995–1996 campaign was the 90th season in Atlético Madrid's history and their 60th season in La Liga, the top division of Spanish football. The team won 'The Double' both La Liga and Copa del Rey in a great season for supporters.

Squad
Squad at end of season

Left club during season

Starting 11
 GK: #1,  José Francisco Molina
 RB: #20,  Delfí Geli
 CB: #4,  Roberto Solozábal
 CB: #6,  Santi Krkela
 LB: #3,  Toni Pinkila
 RM: #14,  Diego Simeone
 CM: #8,  Juan Vizcaíno
 CM: #21,  José Luis Caminero
 LM: #10,  Milinko Pantić
 CF: #9,  Lyuboslav Penev
 CF: #19,  Kiko

Transfers

In
  Fernando Correa –  River Plate
  Milinko Pantić –  Panionios
  Lyuboslav Penev –  Valencia
  José Francisco Molina –  Albacete
  Santi Denia –  Albacete
  Roberto Fresnedoso –  Espanyol
  Leonardo Biagini –  Newell's Old Boys

Out
  Abel Resino –  Rayo Vallecano
  Adolfo Valencia –  Independiente Santa Fe
  Roman Kosecki –  Nantes
  Igor Dobrovolski –  Fortuna Düsseldorf

Competitions

La Liga

League table

Results by round

Matches

Copa del Rey

Second Round

Third Round

Round of 16

Quarterfinals

Semifinals

Final

Statistics

Players statistics
Starts + substitute appearances

Left club during season

Goal scorers
  Lubo Penev – 22
  Diego Simeone – 12
  Kiko – 11
  Milinko Pantić – 10
  Caminero – 9
  Roberto – 3
  Juan Vizcaíno – 3
  Leonardo Biagini – 3
  Juanma López – 2
  Juan Carlos – 2
  Delfí Geli – 1
  Pirri Mori – 1

See also
Atlético Madrid
1995–96 La Liga
1995–96 Copa del Rey

References

1995-96
Spanish football clubs 1995–96 season
1995-96